Samuel Shilton (born 21 July 1978) is an English former footballer who played as a defender or midfielder.

Career

Football League
Shilton started his football career with Plymouth Argyle as a trainee in August 1994. Roughly one year later, he was the subject of a £125,000 transfer to Midlands side Coventry City. During his time with the "Sky Blues", he played just six games before moving on to Hartlepool United. After three rather successful seasons with Hartlepool, Shilton moved back to the Midlands to Kidderminster Harriers where he appeared 79 times.

Non League
His next move was to Conference National side Burton Albion where he stayed for just over a year.

Hinckley United
He joined Hinckley United in July 2005, starting in midfield for the Conference North club, but an injury crisis caused him to be moved to defence. He played so well in that position that he was ever present in his defence role for Hinckley United, making over 100 appearances.

Kettering Town
Shilton left Hinckley on 7 December 2007, signing for Kettering Town. but made just two appearances during the 2007–08 season.

Solihull Moors
He moved on to Solihull Moors for the 2008–09 season. but was released, however, on 3 October 2008.

Bedworth United
After his release from Solihull Moors, Shilton was without a club for a season, but later moved onto Bedworth United of the Southern League Division One Midlands. He had been training with the club during the summer of 2009 before subsequently joining the club.

Hinckley United (second spell)
In August 2013, Hinckley United confirmed Shilton as one of their registered players for the 2013–14 season.

Personal life
He is the son of former England goalkeeper Peter Shilton.

External links

http://www.yorkpress.co.uk/sport/yorkcityfc/4679026.York_City_boss_Martin_Foyle_to_check_out_FA_Cup_foes_Bedworth_United_tonight/
http://www.samshiltoncounselling.org.uk

References

1978 births
Living people
Footballers from Nottingham
English footballers
Association football defenders
Premier League players
National League (English football) players
English Football League players
Plymouth Argyle F.C. players
Coventry City F.C. players
Hartlepool United F.C. players
Kidderminster Harriers F.C. players
Burton Albion F.C. players
Hinckley United F.C. players
Kettering Town F.C. players
Solihull Moors F.C. players
Bedworth United F.C. players